Branchiostegus serratus, the Australian barred tilefish, is a species of marine ray-finned fish, a tilefish belonging to the family Malacanthidae. It is found in eastern Australia.

References

Malacanthidae
Taxa named by James Keith Dooley
Taxa named by John Richard Paxton
Fish described in 1975